Ibrahim A. Warde (Arabic: ابراهيم وردة) is a scholar and consultant in the fields of international finance and global political economy. He is an adjunct professor of international business at The Fletcher School of Law and Diplomacy at Tufts University, where he previously served as the director of the Fares Center for Eastern Mediterranean Studies. Warde is a Carnegie Scholar and the author of several books, which include The Price of Fear: The Truth Behind the Financial War on Terror and Islamic Finance in the Global Economy. He is also a writer for Le Monde Diplomatique. Warde currently serves the academic director of the Robinson Fund for business diplomacy between the United States and the Arab World.

Education
Warde attended Saint Joseph University in Beirut and graduated with a B.A. and later earned an M.B.A. from Ecole des Hautes Etudes Commerciales (HEC). Warde also holds an M.A. and a Ph.D. in Political Science from University of California, Berkeley.

Career
Warde teaches at The Fletcher School of Law and Diplomacy at Tufts University. He has previously taught at the Sloan School of Management at MIT, and the University of California, Berkeley, Davis, and Santa Cruz.

Books authored
Islamic Finance in the Global Economy (Edinburgh University Press, 2013)  
The Price of Fear: The Truth behind the Financial War on Terror, (University of California Press, 2007)  
Mythologies américaines, with co-authored Marie Agnès Combesque ( Le Félin, 2002) 
Le modèle Anglo-Saxon en question, co-authored with Richard Farnetti (Economica, 1997)

References

The Fletcher School at Tufts University faculty
Living people
Year of birth missing (living people)